The Dreibelbis Station Bridge  is a  Burr arch truss covered bridge spanning Maiden Creek between Windsor Township and Greenwich Township, south of Lenhartsville in Berks County, Pennsylvania. The bridge was built in 1869 and was added to the National Register of Historic Places on February 23, 1981.

See also
List of bridges documented by the Historic American Engineering Record in Pennsylvania
National Register of Historic Places listings in Berks County, Pennsylvania

References

External links

Road bridges on the National Register of Historic Places in Pennsylvania
Bridges completed in 1869
Bridges in Berks County, Pennsylvania
Historic American Engineering Record in Pennsylvania
1869 establishments in Pennsylvania
National Register of Historic Places in Berks County, Pennsylvania
Burr Truss bridges in the United States